This article contains information about the literary events and publications of 1505.

Events
Unknown date
Thomas Murner is "crowned" Poet Laureate to Maximilian I, Holy Roman Emperor.
Giovanni Battista Ramusio becomes secretary to Alvise (or Aloisio) Mocenigo, member of the patrician Mocenigo family.

New books

Prose
Georges Chastellain (died 1475) – 
Stephen Hawes – The Temple of Glass
Lodovico Lazzarelli (died 1500) – Crater Hermetis
Pierre Le Baud (died September 29) – Cronique des roys et princes de Bretaigne armoricane (completed)
Primer of Claude of France

Poetry

Pietro Bembo – Gli Asolani
Jean Lemaire de Belges – Epîtres de l'amant vert

Births

February 4 – Mikołaj Rej, Polish poet, politician and musician (died 1569)
Unknown date – Margaret Roper, English writer and translator, daughter of Thomas More (died 1544)
Approximate year
Nicholas Bourbon, French court preceptor and poet (died 1550)
Lodovico Castelvetro, Italian literary critic (died 1571)
John Wedderburn, Scottish religious reformer and poet (died 1556)
Hugh Weston, English churchman and academic (died 1556) 
Georg Wickram, German poet and novelist (died before 1562)
Wu Cheng'en, Chinese novelist and poet (died c. 1580)

Deaths
August 30 – Tito Vespasiano Strozzi, Italian Latin-language poet (born c. 1424)
September 29 – Pierre Le Baud, French historian (born c.1450) 
October 4 (buried) – Robert Wydow, English poet, church musician and cleric (born 1446)
Unknown date 
Adam of Fulda, German musical writer (born c. 1445)
Al-Suyuti, Egyptian religious scholar, juristic expert, teacher and Islamic theologian (born c. 1445)
Veit Arnpeck, Bavarian historian (born 1440)

References

1505

1505 books
Years of the 16th century in literature